Over the years, many members of the Fraternity of Phi Gamma Delta (also known as FIJI) have gained notability in their chosen fields.  Examples include one U.S. President (Calvin Coolidge), four U.S. Vice Presidents, eleven Presidential Medal of Freedom recipients, five Medal of Honor recipients, six Pulitzer Prize winners, two Nobel Prize winners, over 80 competitors in the Olympic Games (of which at least 28 Fijis have won at least 37 medals), and at least seven billionaires.

Business 
 Stuart W. "Stu" Evey (Washington, 1956): former Chairman of the Board of ESPN
 Thomas Dundon (SMU, 1993): Chairman and Managing Partner of Dundon Capital Partners; owner of the Carolina Hurricanes of the National Hockey League; billionaire
 Giovanni Feroce (University of Rhode Island, 1991): former CEO of Alex and Ani; current CEO of Benrus
 Jess Jackson  (California, 1952): wine entrepreneur; namesake of Kendall-Jackson winery and majority owner of Curlin, the 2007 Preakness Stakes winner, 2007 Belmont Stakes second-place finisher, and 2007 Kentucky Derby third-place finisher
 Fritz Henderson (Michigan, 1980): President and CEO of General Motors
 Philip Knight (Oregon, 1959): co-founder, owner and president of Nike Corporation; billionaire
 Josiah K. Lilly, III  (Cornell, 1939): philanthropist; Lilly Endowment and heir to Eli Lilly and Company
 Edmund C. Lynch (Johns Hopkins University, 1907): a founder of the Merrill Lynch investment company
 Patrick McGovern (MIT, 1959): Chairman of the Board of International Data Group; founder of the McGovern Institute for Brain Research; billionaire
Nelson Peltz (born 1942): billionaire businessman and investor
 Albert J. Reid Western Reserve University, 1925 : President Reid Coal, President North American Retail Coal Dealers Association c 1930-1938
 Tom Ryan (Rhode Island, 1975): President and CEO of CVS
 Donald Trump Jr. (University of Pennsylvania): EVP of The Trump Organization
 Chet Upham (Texas, 1945): founder of Upham Oil and Gas in Mineral Wells, Texas; former Texas Republican Party chairman
 Alfred J. Verrecchia (Rhode Island, 1965): Chairman of the Board of Hasbro Inc.
 Kessel Stelling (Georgia, 1978): Chairman of the Board & CEO of Synovus Bank
 Byron Trott (University of Chicago, 1981): founder, chairman, and CEO of BDT Capital Partners
 Charlie Ergen (University of Tennessee, 1975): co-founder and chairman of Dish Network and EchoStar; billionaire

Civil service 

 Victor G. Atiyeh (Oregon, 1945): former Governor of Oregon
 Newton D. Baker (Johns Hopkins, 1892): former Secretary of War
 Alphonzo E. Bell Jr. (Occidental, 1938): U.S. House of Representatives, California for eight terms; Republican National Committee; the southern California communities of Bell, Bell Gardens and Bel Air are named after his family
 Robert Bork (University of Chicago): Judge of the United States Court of Appeals for the District of Columbia Circuit, 1982–1988; United States Attorney General, October 20, 1973 – December 17, 1973
 Calvin Coolidge (Amherst, 1895): thirtieth President of the United States of America, twenty-ninth Vice President of the United States
 Admiral (Ret.) William J. Crowe Jr. (Oklahoma, 1946): former Chairman of the Joint Chiefs of Staff; Ambassador to the United Kingdom
 Ed Edmondson (Oklahoma, 1940): U.S. Representative from Oklahoma 1953-1973
 J. Howard Edmondson (Oklahoma, 1946): 16th Governor of Oklahoma ; U.S. Senator from Oklahoma
 Charles W. Fairbanks (Ohio Wesleyan, 1872): twenty-sixth Vice President of the United States; namesake of Fairbanks, Alaska
Neil M. Gorsuch (Columbia, 1988): judge for the United States Court of Appeals for the Tenth Circuit; Justice, Supreme Court of the United States, 2017
 David Hall (Oklahoma, 1952): 20th Governor of Oklahoma
Dave Hancock (University of Alberta, 1972): former Premier of Alberta
 Eric Holcomb (Hanover College, 1990): Governor of Indiana, 2017, Indiana
 John N. Hostettler (Rose–Hulman Institute of Technology, 1983): former U.S. House of Representatives, Indiana
 Frank Iacobucci (British Columbia, 1962): former Justice, Supreme Court of Canada
 Joseph R. Kerrey (Nebraska, 1965): U.S. Senator, Nebraska (1989-2001); former Governor of Nebraska
 Herbert H. Lehman (Williams College, 1899): humanitarian; four-term Governor of New York; United States Senator from New York; Colonel in the US Army during World War I
 Thomas R. Marshall (Wabash, 1873): twenty-eighth Vice President of the United States
 Robert S. McNamara (California, 1937): former United States Secretary of Defense
 William Yoast Morgan (University of Kansas, 1885): Lieutenant Governor of Kansas
 Frank O'Bannon (Indiana, 1952): former Governor of Indiana
 Mike Pence (Hanover College, 1981): former Vice President of the United States of America; former Governor of Indiana; former United States Representative from Indiana
 Jared Polis (Princeton University, 1996): Governor of Colorado; former U.S. House of Representatives, Colorado
Jim Prentice (University of Alberta, 1976): former Premier of Alberta; former Minister within the federal Canadian cabinet
 Donald Randall Richberg (University of Chicago, 1901): head of the National Recovery Administration; composer of several Fiji songs
 Charles E. Rushmore (College of the City of New York, 1876): namesake of the Mount Rushmore National Memorial
 Byron R. White (Colorado, 1938): former Supreme Court Justice; College Football Hall of Fame
 Mitch Daniels (Purdue, 2013): former Governor of Indiana

Entertainment 

 Scott Bakula (Kansas, 1977): actor, Quantum Leap, Murphy Brown, and Star Trek: Enterprise
 William Jan Berry (UCLA, 1963): singer and guitar player, "surfer sound" duo Jan and Dean
 Dick Carson (University of Nebraska, 1949): television director
 John W. "Johnny" Carson (Nebraska, 1949): former host of NBC's The Tonight Show Starring Johnny Carson
 Luis Moro (Rutgers University 1987), actor, filmmaker, writer, best known for the film Love and Suicide, which made him the first American to break the embargo on Cuba to film a feature there
 Willam S. "Bill" Fiorio, also known as Duke Tumatoe (Illinois, 1969): former guitarist for REO Speedwagon
 Radney Foster (Sewanee, 1982): country music singer/songwriter; "Nobody Wins", "Just Call Me Lonesome"
 Matthew C. Fox (Columbia, 1989): actor, Party of Five, Lost
 Jim Gaffigan (Purdue University, 1987): comedian
 Samuel S. Hinds (New York University, 1897): actor, It's A Wonderful Life
 Richard Jenkins (Illinois Wesleyan University), actor, Step Brothers, Six Feet Under
 Paul McDonald (Auburn), musician; American Idol season 10 
 Bob McGrath (Michigan, 1954); played "Bob" on Sesame Street
 Seth Meyers (Northwestern University, 1996): cast member and head writer of Saturday Night Live, host of Late Night with Seth Meyers
 Ralph Morgan (Columbia, 1904): actor; co-founder, charter member and first president of the Screen Actors Guild
 Cory Morrow (Texas Tech, 1990): country singer/songwriter
 Jason Isbell (Memphis State), : rock and alt-country singer/songwriter; former member of The Drive-By Truckers; current member of Jason Isbelle the 400 Unit
 Dermot Mulroney (Northwestern University, 1985): actor, My Best Friend's Wedding, About Schmidt, The Wedding Date, The Family Stone
 Rob Riggle (University of Kansas): actor, comedian, The Hangover, The Daily Show with Jon Stewart, and Saturday Night Live
 John Ritter (Southern California, 1970): actor, Three's Company, Hearts Afire and 8 Simple Rules for Dating My Teenage Daughter
 Morgan Spurlock (NYU, 1993): independent movie director, creator of Super Size Me
 McLean Stevenson (Northwestern University, 1948): Actor, M*A*S*H.

Media and literature
 Lew Wallace (Depauw, 1868)  lawyer, Union general in the American Civil War, governor of the New Mexico Territory, politician, diplomat, and author of Ben-Hur: A Tale of the Christ (1880)
 Roone Arledge (Columbia, 1952): former President of ABC News and Sports; first producer of Wide World of Sports; creator of Monday Night Football, 20/20, ABC World News Tonight, Nightline, This Week, and Primetime Live; won 37 Emmy Awards; is in the Television Hall of Fame
 Ken Blanchard (Cornell, 1961): management consultant; author of The One Minute Manager
 Holden Bowler (University of Idaho, 1931): singer in the Robert Shaw Chorale; namesake of J. D. Salinger's character Holden Caulfield
 Will Cuppy (Chicago, 1907): humorist, author of The Decline and Fall of Practically Everybody
 David H. DePatie (Sewanee, 1951): film producer; producer of animated cartoons
 Rob Johnson (DePauw University): Emmy Award-winning news anchor
 Thomas A. Desjardin (Florida State, 1986): author and Civil War scholar
 Major Garrett (University of Missouri): Chief White House Correspondent with CBS News
 Bill Geist (Illinois, 1967): best-selling author, Emmy Award-winning journalist and contributor to CBS Sunday Morning
 Paul Kangas (Michigan, 1959): anchor and commentator on Nightly Business Report
 Jack Kerouac (Columbia): author
 Brian Lamb (Purdue, 1963): founder and host of C-SPAN.
 Ross Lockridge Jr. (Indiana, 1935): novelist, author of Raintree County
 Dan Mangan (University of British Columbia, 2005), Juno Award-winning singer/songwriter
 Frank Norris (California, 1894): author of The Octopus: A Story of California and McTeague
 Tom Peters (Cornell University, 1964): author of In Search of Excellence
 Dave Revsine (Northwestern University, 1991): sportscaster for ESPN
 E. B. White (Cornell, 1921): novelist, author of Charlotte's Web and Stuart Little
 D. Harlan Wilson (Wittenberg University, 1993): author and professor
 Robert U. Woodward (Yale, 1965): assistant managing editor of The Washington Post; author

Religion 
 Edmond Browning (Sewanee, 1952): 24th Presiding Bishop and Primate of the Episcopal Church in the United States of America
 Norman Vincent Peale (Ohio Wesleyan, 1920): theologian; author of The Power of Positive Thinking

Science, technology, and medicine
 Luis Walter Alvarez (Chicago, 1932): Nobel Prize winner, Physics, 1968.
 Eugene Cernan (Purdue, 1956): astronaut, Gemini and Apollo space programs; last man to walk on the Moon
Malcolm Renfrew (Idaho, 1932): polymer chemist, Teflon development
Jack Swigert (Colorado, 1953): astronaut, Apollo program; U.S. Congressman-elect

Presidential Medal of Freedom recipients

Johnny Carson  (Nebraska, 1949)
William J. Crowe  (Oklahoma, 1946)
Brian Lamb (Purdue University, 1963)
Herbert H. Lehman  (Williams College, 1899)
Norman Vincent Peale  (Ohio Wesleyan, 1920)
Robert S. McNamara  (California, 1937)
Jack Nicklaus  (Ohio State, 1961)
Jack Swigert  (Colorado, 1953)
Byron R. White  (Colorado, 1938)
E. B. White  (Cornell, 1921)

Medal of Honor recipients
 Tedford H. Cann (CCNY, 1920): Seaman, USN
 Marcellus H. Chiles (Colorado College, 1916): Captain, USA
 Joseph R. Kerrey (Nebraska, 1965): Lieutenant, Junior Grade, USN Reserve SEAL Team
 George H. Ramer (Bucknell, 1950): 2nd Lieutenant, USMC Reserve
 Joseph H. Thompson (Pittsburgh, 1905): Major, USA

Nobel Prize winners

Luis Walter Alvarez  (Chicago, 1932): awarded the 1968 Nobel Prize for Physics
Frederick Chapman Robbins  (Missouri, 1936): awarded, along with two other colleagues, the 1954 Nobel Prize in Physiology or Medicine

Pulitzer Prize winners

Douglas Southall Freeman  (University of Richmond, 1904): awarded in 1935 for R. E. Lee and posthumously in 1958 for George Washington, Volumes I – VI
David Hall  (Tennessee, 1965): awarded along with the Denver Post in 1986 for in-depth reporting on missing children.
Haynes B. Johnson (Missouri, 1952): awarded in 1966 for his work in the Washington Evening Star covering the civil rights crisis in Selma, Alabama
Bernadotte E. Schmitt  (Tennessee, 1904): awarded in 1931 for The Coming of the War 1914
E. B. White (Cornell, 1921): awarded in 1978 under "Special Awards and Citations – Letters" for the full body of his work
Robert Woodward  (Yale, 1965): awarded along with the entire staff of the Washington Post in 1973 for coverage of the Watergate crisis

General officers

These are notable members who have achieved the rank of Brigadier General, Rear Admiral (lower half), (or the equivalent) or higher in the United States military.

 Major General Clovis E. Byers (Ohio State, 1921): United States Army.  Chief of Staff, Eighth US Army.
 Admiral (Ret.) William J. Crowe Jr.  (Oklahoma, 1946): United States Navy. Chairman of the Joint Chiefs of Staff (1985–1989); Ambassador to Great Britain.
 General George Decker (Lafayette, 1924): United States Army. Chief of Staff, United States Army (1960–1962).
 General Robert L. Eichelberger (Ohio State, 1907): United States Army. Superintendent of West Point; Commander of the Eighth US Army in the South West Pacific theater in World War II.
 General Bruce K. Holloway (Tennessee, 1933): United States Air Force.  Member of the Flying Tigers, becoming commander after the Flying Tigers became 23rd Fighter Group. Shot down 13 enemy aircraft.  Commanded the Air Force's first jet-equipped fighter group.  Commanded USAFE, was appointed Vice Chief of Staff, USAF and was Commander-in-Chief of Strategic Air Command.
 Major General LeRoy P. Hunt (California, 1914): United States Marine Corps.  Commander, 5th Marines at the battle of Guadalcanal.
 Brigadier General Albert Gallatin Jenkins (Jefferson College, 1848): Confederate Cavalry Brigade Commander and delegate to the first Confederate Congress.  Occupied Chambersburg, Pennsylvania in 1863 and was wounded at the Battle of Gettysburg.
 RADM Robert D. Reilly, Jr (Washington, 1975): United States Navy;  Commander of Military Sealift Command; former Commander of USS Harry S. Truman (CVN 75) Carrier Strike Group

Liberty ship namesakes 
"Liberty ships" were cargo ships built rapidly in the United States in order to transport supplies overseas during World War II.  Over 2700 Liberty ships were made, and several were named after members of Phi Gamma Delta.  These include:
 Calvin Coolidge (hull number 773)
 Frank Norris (hull number 2158)
 Zebulon B. Vance (hull number 145) (launched December 6, 1941, the day before the attack on Pearl Harbor)

Sports 

 Chuck Armstrong (Purdue, 1964): President and COO of the Seattle Mariners
 Sal Bando (Arizona State, 1966): professional baseball player with the Kansas City Athletics, Oakland Athletics, Milwaukee Brewers; General Manager of the Milwaukee Brewers
 Clay Bennett (Oklahoma, 1981): Chairman of the Professional Basketball Club; owner of the Oklahoma City Thunder professional basketball team; billionaire
 Tom Brookshier (University of Colorado, 1953):  Professional Football Player, Jersey #40 retired by Philadelphia Eagles (1953-1961); 1960 National Football League championship and later teamed with Pat Summerall as CBS’s No. 1 professional football broadcasting duo
John Cappelletti (Penn State): Professional football player; winner of the Heisman Trophy; member of the College Football Hall of Fame
 Keith Carney (University of Maine, 1991): professional hockey player for Buffalo Sabres, Chicago Blackhawks, Phoenix Coyotes, Anaheim Ducks, Vancouver Canucks, and the Minnesota Wild
 Skip Caray (Missouri, 1961): Announcer, Atlanta Braves
 Meredith Colket (University of Pennsylvania), 1901 B.S., 1904 LL.B, Olympic silver medal winner in pole vault at 1900 Summer Olympics
 Tim Finchem (Richmond, 1969): PGA Tour commissioner
 Billy Cundiff (Drake University, 2002): Professional football player, Dallas Cowboys, Tampa Bay Buccaneers, Green Bay Packers, New Orleans Saints, Baltimore Ravens, Cleveland Browns
 Brian Griese (Michigan, 1997): professional football player with the Denver Broncos, Miami Dolphins, Tampa Bay Buccaneers, and Chicago Bears
 E. J. Holub (Texas Tech, 1961): professional football player, Dallas Texans/Kansas City Chiefs; Collegiate All-American; AFL All-Star
 Mike Huff (Northwestern University, 1985): professional baseball player with the Los Angeles Dodgers, Cleveland Indians, Chicago White Sox, and Toronto Blue Jays
 Hale Irwin (Colorado, 1967): professional golfer; member of the World Golf Hall of Fame
 Roy Jackson (Pennsylvania, 1961): former owner of the racehorse Barbaro, winner of the 2006 Kentucky Derby
 Mark Loretta  (Northwestern University, 1993): professional baseball player with the Los Angeles Dodgers, Milwaukee Brewers, Houston Astros, San Diego Padres, and Boston Red Sox; winner of the Hutch Award
 Christy Mathewson (Bucknell, 1902): professional baseball player; member of the Baseball Hall of Fame
 Bob Mathias (Stanford, 1953): two-time Olympic decathlon gold medalist (1948 and 1952); United States Congressman
 Hugh Millen (Washington, 1986): professional football player with the Los Angeles Rams, Atlanta Falcons, New England Patriots, and Denver Broncos
 Jack Nicklaus (Ohio State, 1961): professional golfer; member of World Golf Hall of Fame
 Peter O'Malley (University of Pennsylvania): former President and owner of the Los Angeles Dodgers
 Jerry Pate (Alabama, 1974): professional golfer; winner, 1976 U.S. Open
 Clancy Pendergast (University of Arizona, 1990): NFL and NCAA football coach
 Roger Penske (Lehigh, 1959): co-founder of Championship Auto Racing Teams (CART); owner of Penske Racing; winner of 15 Indianapolis 500s and 9 CART points titles; billionaire
 Mike Peplowski (Michigan State University, 1993): NBA basketball player for the Sacramento Kings and Detroit Pistons 
 Bobby Rahal (Denison University, 1975): race car driver; winner of the Indianapolis 500
 Greg Schiano (Bucknell, 1988): head coach, Tampa Bay Buccaneers football team; brought Rutgers from being winless in the Big East in 2001 to a #12 national ranking and a Texas Bowl victory over Kansas State in 2006
 Denny Shute (Western Reserve 1927): professional golfer; member of the World Golf Hall of Fame
 Dean Smith (Kansas, 1953): former North Carolina Tar Heels men's basketball coach; member of the Basketball Hall of Fame
 Bill Snyder (William Jewell, 1963): former Kansas State Wildcats football coach; member of the College Football Hall of Fame
 Payne Stewart (Southern Methodist, 1979): professional golfer; member of the World Golf Hall of Fame
 Edwin Sweetland (Cornell, 1899): first salaried basketball coach of the Kentucky Wildcats; head football coach at Syracuse, Ohio State, Colgate, Kentucky, Miami University, West Virginia, and Tulane 
Matthew Wolff (Oklahoma State ) ; PGA golfer
 James B. Tafel (Pittsburgh, 1949): owner of Street Sense, winner of the 2007 Kentucky Derby, the 2007 Travers Stakes and 2007 Preakness Stakes runner-up
 Byron White (University of Colorado, 1938): ; College Football Hall of Fame; United States Supreme Court Justice
 Percy Williams (British Columbia, 1928): Olympic sprinter; gold medalist
 Tom Yawkey (Yale University, 1925): owner, Boston Red Sox, member of the Baseball Hall of Fame

Fijis in sports halls of fame 
Baseball Hall of Fame in Cooperstown, New York
 Christy Mathewson (Bucknell, 1902): elected in the first class in 1936
 Tom Yawkey (Yale, 1925): elected in 1980

Basketball Hall of Fame in Springfield, Massachusetts
 Howard Cann (NYU, 1918)
 Clifford Carlson (Pittsburgh, 1918)
Chuck Hyatt (Pittsburgh, 1930)
William Reid (Colgate, 1918)
Dean Smith (Kansas, 1953)
Oswald Tower (Williams, 1907)

Canadian Football Hall of Fame in Hamilton, Ontario
Ormand Beach (Kansas, 1933)
Wes Cutler (Toronto, 1933)
Tony Gabriel (Syracuse, 1971)
Ron Lancaster (Wittenberg, 1960)

College Football Hall of Fame in South Bend, Indiana
Byron R. White  (University of Colorado, 1938)
Francis "Reds" Bagnell (Pennsylvania, 1951): inducted 1977
John Cappelletti (Penn State, 1974): inducted 1993)
William Beattie Feathers (Tennessee, 1934): inducted 1955
Charles W. "Chic" Harley (Ohio State, 1919): inducted in the first class, 1951
E. J. Holub (Texas Tech, 1961): inducted 1986
Myles Lane (Dartmouth, 1928): inducted 1970
Gene McEver (Tennessee, 1931): inducted 1954
Les Richter (California @ Berkeley, 1952): inducted 1982
Bill Snyder (William Jewell, 1963): inducted 2015
Roger Wehrli (Missouri, 1968): inducted 2003

National Lacrosse Hall of Fame in Baltimore, Maryland
William K. Morrill Jr. (Johns Hopkins, 1959)
William C. Schmeisser (Johns Hopkins, 1902)

National Wrestling Hall of Fame in Stillwater, Oklahoma
Howell Scobey (Lehigh, 1936)
Bob Konovsky (Wisconsin, 1956)

Pro Football Hall of Fame in Canton, Ohio
Earl "Dutch" Clark (Colorado College, 1933): inducted 1963
Roger Wehrli (Missouri, 1968): inducted 2007

United States Bicycling Hall of Fame in Bridgewater Township, New Jersey
Marcus Hurley (Columbia, 1908)

United States Olympic Hall of Fame
Bob Mathias (Stanford, 1953)
1956 U.S. Basketball team (Bill Hougland (Kansas, 1952))
Roone Arledge (Columbia, 1952), contributor

World Golf Hall of Fame in St. Augustine, Florida
Jack Nicklaus (Ohio State, 1961)
Hale Irwin (Colorado, 1967)
Payne Stewart (Southern Methodist, 1979)
Denny Shute (Western Reserve 1927)

Super Bowl participants 
Eric Bjornson (Washington, 1994): Dallas Cowboys Super Bowl XXX (won) (1995)
Tom Brookshier (Colorado, 1953): Philadelphia Eagles (won) (1960) (prior to AFL–NFL merger)
Jimmy Cefalo (Penn State, 1978): Miami Dolphins Super Bowl XVII (lost) (1983) and Super Bowl XIX (lost) (1985)
Riki Ellison (Southern California, 1982): San Francisco 49ers Super Bowl XIX (won) (1985); Super Bowl XXIII (won) (1989); and, Super Bowl XXIV (won) (1990)
Morgan Cox (University of Tennessee, Knoxville, 2010): Baltimore Ravens Super Bowl XLVII (won)(2012) 
Brian Griese (Michigan, 1997): Denver Broncos Super Bowl XXXIII (won) (1999)
E. J. Holub (Texas Tech, 1961): Kansas City Chiefs Super Bowl I(lost) (1967) and Super Bowl IV (won) (in 1970)
Tom Matte (Ohio State, 1961): Baltimore Colts Super Bowl III (lost) (1969); Super Bowl V (won) (1971)
Robert Steele (North Alabama, 1977): Dallas Cowboys Super Bowl XII (won) (1978)
Matt Suhey (Penn State, 1980): Chicago Bears Super Bowl XX (won) (1986)
Bake Turner (Texas Tech, 1962): New York Jets Super Bowl III (won) (1969)
Tim Foley (Purdue 1969): Miami Dolphins Super Bowl VI (won) (1972) Super Bowl VII (won) (1973)Super Bowl V (lost)(1971)

Presidents of the Boy Scouts of America 
Three Fijis have been President of the Boy Scouts of America:
 John Gottschalk (Nebraska, 1965)
 John W. Creighton Jr. (University of Pittsburgh, Ohio State University, 1954)
 John C. Cushman III (Colgate University, 1963)

Other notable Phi Gams 
 First Lieutenant Sidney Johnson Brooks Jr. (Texas, 1918 and Kansas, 1919): namesake of Brooks Air Force Base in San Antonio
 Francis Marion Bishop (Illinois Wesleyan, 1870): member of Major John Wesley Powell's second expedition down the Colorado River
John M. Howard (Monmouth College, 1869): founder of the Phi Delta Phi legal fraternity in 1871 at the University of Michigan
William L. Prather (Washington and Lee, 1871); President of University of Texas; originator of the phrase "The Eyes of Texas are Upon You"
James J. Stukel (Purdue University): 15th President, University of Illinois
Jere Morehead (University of Georgia, 1988); President of University of Georgia
John P. Neafsey (Cornell University); trustee and presidential councillor of Cornell University; chair of Samuel Curtis Johnson Graduate School of Management

References

External links 
 
 Archives of Phi Gamma Delta

members
Lists of members of United States student societies